The second Ramelow cabinet is the current state government of Thuringia, sworn in on 4 March 2020 after Bodo Ramelow was elected as Minister-President by the members of the Landtag of Thuringia. It is the 8th Cabinet of Thuringia.

It was formed after the 2020 Thuringian government crisis which emerged from the 2019 Thuringian state election. The government is a coalition of The Left (LINKE), the Social Democratic Party (SPD), and Alliance 90/The Greens (GRÜNE). Excluding the Minister-President, the cabinet comprises eight ministers. Four are members of The Left, three are members of the SPD, and two are members of the Greens.

Formation 

The previous cabinet was a coalition government of the Left, SPD, and Greens led by Minister-President Bodo Ramelow of The Left.

The state election took place on 27 October 2019, and resulted in the incumbent coalition losing its majority to the conservative opposition of the AfD, CDU, and FDP. However, all parties had ruled out working with the AfD, and the CDU and FDP had ruled out working with The Left. The Landtag thus became deadlocked as it was not possible to reach a majority without cooperation between two of The Left, the CDU, and the AfD.

Despite this, The Left, SPD, and Greens agreed to renew their coalition as a minority government. The election process for the Minister-President enables a candidate to win with a plurality of votes in the third round if an absolute majority is not reached in the first two.

The Landtag convened for its first session on 5 February 2020. In the first two ballots for Minister-President, there were two candidates: Bodo Ramelow of The Left, and Christoph Kindervater, an independent proposed by the AfD. They fell short of the required majority in the first and second rounds. On the third ballot, the FDP also put forward their state leader Thomas Kemmerich. Kemmerich was elected Minister-President with 45 votes, corresponding to the support of most of the AfD, CDU, and FDP. Ramelow received 44 votes, corresponding to The Left, SPD, Greens, and two members of the opposition. Kindervater received no votes. One abstention was recorded.

Kemmerich's victory was highly unexpected. Neither the CDU nor AfD had indicated that they would support him. The participation of the AfD was perceived as a breach of the cordon sanitaire practised against them by all other parties. It was condemned across the German political spectrum and protests broke out across the country. In addition, Kemmerich insisted that the AfD would not be brought into government, leaving him without a workable majority in the Landtag. He announced his resignation on 8 February.

Following joint discussions, The Left, CDU, SPD, and Greens agreed on 21 February to invest Bodo Ramelow as Minister-President to lead a Left–SPD–Green minority government ahead of a planned early election in April 2021.

Bodo Ramelow was elected Minister-President by the Landtag on 4 March after three rounds of voting. The Left, SPD, and Greens supported Ramelow, while AfD put forward state chairman Björn Höcke and the CDU abstained. The FDP was not present for the vote. Höcke withdrew on the third ballot and Ramelow was elected with 43 votes in favour, 23 against, and 20 abstentions.

Composition

References

Notes

External links

Cabinets of Thuringia
State governments of Germany
Cabinets established in 2020
2020 establishments in Germany